New Carrollton station is a joint Washington Metro, MARC, and Amtrak station just outside the city limits of New Carrollton, Prince George's County, Maryland located at the eastern end of the Metro's Orange Line. The station will also serve as the eastern terminus of the Purple Line, currently under construction, and is adjacent to the Capital Beltway.

Beneath the Metro station platform, a waiting room serves Amtrak's Northeast Regional, Vermonter, and Palmetto trains, as well as MARC's Penn Line trains. The New Carrollton Rail Yard is nearby.

Greyhound, a nationwide intercity bus company, also stops at the station on routes serving Richmond, Washington, Philadelphia, New York City, Pittsburgh, and points beyond.

History
The New Carrollton station is the third station in the area to serve rail traffic.

By the late 1960s, it consisted of a small shelter and an asphalt platform served by a few Penn Central (later Conrail) commuter trains between Washington and Baltimore.

The second, Capital Beltway station, sat just inside the Capital Beltway. Opened on March 16, 1970, it was served by Penn Central (later Amtrak) Metroliners.

In August 1982, Conrail commuter trains (later AMDOT, then the MARC Penn Line) began stopping at Capital Beltway, replacing stops at Lanham and Landover. On October 30, 1983, Amtrak and AMDOT moved from Capital Beltway to a new island platform and waiting room at New Carrollton station.

Until 2003, some Acela Express trains stopped at New Carrollton. In October 2015, the Palmetto began stopping in New Carrollton.

In May 2018, Metro announced an extensive renovation of platforms at twenty stations across the system. The WMATA platforms at New Carrollton station was closed from May 28, 2022, through September 5, 2022, as part of the summer platform improvement project, which also affected the Minnesota Avenue, Deanwood, Cheverly, and Landover stations on the Orange Line. Shuttle buses and free parking were provided at the closed stations.

The Purple Line light rail system will begin at New Carrollton and run west to Bethesda. The line will connect to Washington Metro stations on the Red, Green and Yellow lines. The system is under construction as of 2022 and is scheduled to open in 2026.

Station layout

At New Carrollton, the Northeast Corridor consists of three tracks. The westernmost two tracks (Tracks 2 and 3) have an island platform between them, with Track 1 having no platform. To the east of the Amtrak platform is the Metro platform, serving the Orange Line. Bus loops and parking lots are located on both sides of the rail line.

The station has entrances at Harkins Road and Ellin Road, and Garden City Drive near U.S. Route 50, and Exit 19 on Interstate 495.

Long-term plans for the New Carrollton station include adding a second island platform (providing access to Track 1) and adding a fourth track.

References

External links

 StationMasters Online: New Carrollton Station

Amtrak stations in Maryland
Stations on the Orange Line (Washington Metro)
MARC Train stations
New Carrollton, Maryland
Penn Line
Purple Line (Maryland)
Stations on the Northeast Corridor
Bus stations in Maryland
Washington Metro stations in Maryland
Railway stations in Prince George's County, Maryland
Railway stations in the United States opened in 1978
1978 establishments in Maryland